The Landspítali – The National University Hospital of Iceland offers a wide range of clinical services in outpatient clinics, day patient units, inpatient wards, clinical laboratories and other divisions. Landspítalinn also operates the psychiatric hospital Kleppur.

History 
The original Landspítali began operations on 20 December 1930. Ideas for a hospital that served the whole country was not new; in 1863, Jón Hjaltalín, the then Director of Health, proposed a bill that would establish such a hospital, but the bill was not voted on.

During the period from 1863 to 1930, several hospitals operated in Reykjavík. The founding of Landspítali was the product of a long, hard struggle in which women were at the forefront and have ever since played a huge role in the country's hospital matters. In 2000, the Reykjavik City Hospital merged with Landspítali, and the new merged hospital was renamed as Landspítali University Hospital (Landspítali háskólasjúkrahús; LSH) until it reverted to its original name in 2007.

Approximately 70% of Icelandic children are born in the hospital.

References

External links 
 Official website (English and Faroese settings on top of page) 

Hospital buildings completed in 2000
Hospitals in Iceland
Medical education in Iceland
Teaching hospitals
Buildings and structures in Reykjavík